The 1914–15 Prima Categoria season was won by Genoa.

This championship was suspended due to Italy entering World War I.

Despite the season not concluding, Genoa was declared champion by the Federation after the end of the War, because it was on top of the table with one game remaining in Northern Italy Final Round.

Regulation
Struggles between minor and major clubs continued. As a compromise, the championship was divided in a preliminary regional phase of ten matchdays, while the following national phase was split into a semifinal round and a final round of six matchdays each. More, the championship would be split in two categories, A and B, for 1915–16 season. However, finally the championship was expanded to 36 clubs.

The main tournament was split in six groups of six clubs. First and second clubs, together with the four best third teams, advanced to the national championship. Forth and worst clubs would be relegated to new Category B.

National championship was split in four groups of four clubs. Group winners advanced to the final group of four clubs. The whole tournament consequently had twenty-two matchdays.

The experimental Southern groups had their own special regulations.

Teams
Veloces Biella for Piedmont, Cremonese for Lombardy, Padova for Veneto and Audax Modena for Emilia had been promoted. Two relegated clubs were re-elected. More, minor clubs voted to expand the championship so Acqui, Valenzana, Savoia Milan and Swiss side FC Chiasso were invited to join.

Main tournament

Qualifications

The first two teams of every group and the best four teams that finished third, advanced to the semifinals.

Group A and B were organized by the Turin committee, group C and D and E by the Milan committee, and group F by the Venice committee.

Group A

Classification

Results table

Group B

Classification

Results table

Group C

Savoia Milano forfeited before the start of the Championship.

Classification

Results table

Group D

Classification

Results table

Group E

Classification

Results table

Group F

Classification

Results table

Semifinals

Group A

Classification

Results

Group B

Classification

Results

Group C

Classification

Results

Group D

Classification

Results

Final round

Classification

Results table

Southern Italy tournament

Central and Southern Italy Final Round not played because Italy entered World War I on May 24, 1915. Consequently, even the National Finals could not be played.

Footnotes

References and sources
Almanacco Illustrato del Calcio - La Storia 1898-2004, Panini Edizioni, Modena, September 2005

1914-15
1914–15 in European association football leagues